Boban Georgiev (born 26 January 1997) is a Macedonian professional footballer who plays as a left winger.

Club career
Born in Štip, Georgiev made his senior debut with Metalurg Skopje in the 2014–15 Macedonian First Football League season but at time was still mostly used in the youth championship. In 2016, he signed with hometown club Bregalnica, where his patience of being mostly a reserve during the first season (two appearances only), paid off, as in the 2016–17 season he became a standard first-team player and scored 6 goals in 29 appearances. However, the Macedonian league is formed of just 10 teams, and Bregalnica was relegated as it finished 9th, so Georgiev's boost during the season made it highly improbable for the young talent to play in the second league. 

In the summer of 2017, he signed with Sileks, a mid-table team. Despite interest of bigger clubs, those were giving priority to experienced players, while Sileks granted him playtime since the very beginning. After another mid-table season, Georgiev enjoyed being a regular and making another consecutive season with 29 league appearances. His position in Sileks grew even stronger in the second season in the club by making 34 league appearances crowned with 8 goals. His performance didn't passed unnoticed, and, despite Sileks avoided relegation at the play-off´s, Georgiev felt it was time for new greater challenges, and by end of June 2019, he signed with Serbian side Radnik Surdulica. Georgiev's signing was soon followed by his compatriot Nikola Bogdanovski, and the joined the already well established Zoran Danoski. Georgiev made his debut for Radnik in a 4–0 home victory against Spartak Subotica, scoring two goals.

On 2 September 2020, he signed a two-year contract with Bosnian Premier League club Borac Banja Luka. Georgiev made his official debut for Borac nine days later, on 11 September, in a league game against Sarajevo. He scored his first goal for Borac in a cup game against Travnik on 30 September 2020. Georgiev won his only trophy with Borac on 23 May 2021, getting crowned Bosnian Premier League champions one game before the end of the 2020–21 season. He left Borac after his contract with the club expired in June 2021.

International career
Georgiev made his international debut in 2013 for the Macedonia U17 national team at the 2013 UEFA European Under-17 Championship qualifiers. At the time he hadn't even made his senior debut at club level, but his talent stood up. Afterwards, an option to choose mid-table Macedonian clubs such as Bregalnica or Sileks to gain more playing time, cost Georgiev to sacrifice to fight for the national team spots, which inevitably coaches gave preference to either foreign-based, or big clubs reserves talents. However, his performance in 2017 was impossible to be ignored and he returned to the national team, this time the U21 national team in their 2017 UEFA European Under-21 Championship qualifiers.

Career statistics

Club

Honours
Borac Banja Luka
Bosnian Premier League: 2020–21

References

1997 births
Living people
Sportspeople from Štip
Association football wingers
Macedonian footballers
North Macedonia youth international footballers
FK Metalurg Skopje players
FK Bregalnica Štip players
FK Sileks players
FK Radnik Surdulica players
FK Borac Banja Luka players
Macedonian First Football League players
Serbian SuperLiga players
Premier League of Bosnia and Herzegovina players
Macedonian expatriate footballers
Expatriate footballers in Serbia
Macedonian expatriate sportspeople in Serbia
Expatriate footballers in Bosnia and Herzegovina
Macedonian expatriate sportspeople in Bosnia and Herzegovina